Upham is an inhabited, unincorporated community and place in Sierra County, New Mexico, United States. It has gained recognition for being near the site for the Spaceport America facility being developed by the New Mexico Spaceport Authority. This will be Virgin Galactic's world headquarters and mission control location.

Virgin Galactic is the first space tourism company to develop commercial flights into space.

Sub-orbital commercial space launches began in 2007.

Education
Truth or Consequences Municipal Schools is the school district for the entire county. Truth or Consequences Middle School and Hot Springs High School, both in Truth or Consequences, are the district's secondary schools.

References

External links
 Google map of Upham, New Mexico
 New Mexico Spaceport blog by Mike McConnell
 

Unincorporated communities in New Mexico
Unincorporated communities in Sierra County, New Mexico